The 1977 Minnesota Twins season was a season in American baseball. The team finished 84–77, fourth in the American League West.

Offseason 
 March 18, 1977: Geoff Zahn was signed as a free agent by the Twins.

Regular season 
In a May 25 double-header at Boston's Fenway Park, outfielder Lyman Bostock tied a major league record with twelve putouts in the first game.  His total of seventeen putouts over both games set a new American League record.

On June 26, a crowd of 46,463 turned up at Metropolitan Stadium to watch first baseman Rod Carew's pursuit of a .400 batting average.  Carew didn't disappoint, going 4 for 5 with six RBI, raising his batting average seven points to .403.  Lost in the commotion was right fielder Glenn Adams' own 4-for-5 performance, as he drove in a Twins-record eight runs.  The Twins beat the Chicago White Sox 19–12.

Rod Carew, outfielder Larry Hisle and catcher Butch Wynegar were named to the All-Star Game.  Carew was the leading AL vote-getter, scoring 405 of 422 possible votes in the national balloting by sports writers and broadcasters.

Carew was named American League Most Valuable Player. In winning his sixth AL batting title, Carew flirted with becoming the first batter since Ted Williams in 1941 to hit .400, finishing at .388. He also had 239 hits, scored a league-leading 128 runs, hit 14 home runs and collected 100 RBI.

Other offensive stars were Larry Hisle, who hit 28 HR and drove in a league-leading 119 runs, and Lyman Bostock, who hit .338 with 104 runs, 14 HR and 90 RBI.

The Twins' ability to score runs was matched by their pitchers' ability to give up runs. Reliever Tom Johnson replaced Bill Campbell, racking up 16 relief wins along with 20 saves. Dave Goltz became a 20-game winner for the first time.

1,162,727 fans attended Twins games, the fourth lowest total in the American League. It was, however, the first time since 1970 that the Twins attracted more than one million fans.

Season standings

Record vs. opponents

Notable transactions 
 April 6, 1977: The Twins purchased the contract of Don Carrithers from the Montreal Expos.
 May 2, 1977: Dave Johnson was purchased by the Twins from the Seattle Mariners.
 June 7, 1977: Darrell Jackson was drafted by the Twins in the 9th round of the 1977 Major League Baseball draft.

Roster

Player stats

Batting

Starters by position 
Note: Pos = Position; G = Games played; AB = At bats; H = Hits; Avg. = Batting average; HR = Home runs; RBI = Runs batted in

Other batters 
Note: G = Games played; AB = At bats; H = Hits; Avg. = Batting average; HR = Home runs; RBI = Runs batted in

Pitching

Starting pitchers 
Note: G = Games pitched; IP = Innings pitched; W = Wins; L = Losses; ERA = Earned run average; SO = Strikeouts

Other pitchers 
Note: G = Games pitched; IP = Innings pitched; W = Wins; L = Losses; ERA = Earned run average; SO = Strikeouts

Relief pitchers 
Note: G = Games pitched; W = Wins; L = Losses; SV = Saves; ERA = Earned run average; SO = Strikeouts

Awards and honors 
 Rod Carew, American League batting champion (.388)
 Rod Carew, Roberto Clemente Award
 Rod Carew, American League MVP

Farm system

Notes

References 
Player stats from www.baseball-reference.com
Team info from www.baseball-almanac.com

Minnesota Twins seasons
Minnesota Twins season
Minnesota Twins